Settler violence may refer to:
Israeli settler violence
Settler violence in French Algeria (1830–1962)